Fastaval is an annual gaming convention in Hobro, Denmark, with focus on role-playing games, live action role-playing games, board games, miniature wargaming and collectible card games. The first many years was held in or around Aarhus but the 2011 Fastaval was held in Silkeborg while the conventions from 2012 to 2016 were held at Mariagerfjord Gymnasiet in Hobro.

The convention has been held on the long weekend of Easter since 1986, with the exception of 1988 and 2020. It was held digital in 2021.

The Otto

Since 1992, Fastaval has presented awards to individuals and role-play scenarios in the form of gilded plaster penguins named Otto. The prizes are awarded at a banquet on the final day of the Fastaval event.

The award inherited its name from a character in the 1989 game called Ulloq Nunaqarfinnguagaluami. The number of Ottos awarded and the categories themselves have been adjusted steadily over the years. The majority of Ottos are awarded for aspects of role-playing scenarios. In 2003 category was introduced for live scenarios which was discontinued in 2006 in favor of keeping both live and tabletop scenarios in competition with each other. Every year, an Honorary Otto is awarded to an individual, group or project who have distinguished themselves by making an extraordinary contribution to Danish roleplaying.

1992 Winners
Best Scenario: Spor der skræmmer! by Paul Hartvigson
Best Special Effects: A by Kresten Kjær Sørensen
Best Game Master: Christian Raeder Clausen
Honorary Otto: Mads Lunau

1993 Winners
Best Scenario: Ejnhemmir by Christine Gjørtz Dragsholm ( Troels Chr. Jakobsen)
Best game people: Ejnhemmir by Christine Gjørtz Dragsholm (a.k.a. Troels Chr. Jakobsen)
Best Roles: Der var så dejligt ude på landet... by Anton Silver Stone and Jens Thorup Rasmussen
Best Handouts: Operation Faust by Ask Agger
Best Presentation: Maskeballet by Thomas Jakobsen and Jacob Berg
Audience Choice: Indianernes Skat by Nikolaj Lemche and Peter Petersen
Honorary Otto: Paul Hartvigson

1994 Winners
Best Scenario: Isabelle by Lars Andresen
Best game people: Et Studie i Ondskab by Mads Lunau
Best Roles: U.S.S. Atlantis by Ask Agger
Best Effects: Laaste Døre by Thomas Sorensen Munkholt
Best Roles: Dr. Frank by Malling ungdomsskoles rollespilshold
Audience Choice: 'Et Studie i Ondskab' by Mads Lunau
Honorary Otto: Troels Chr. Jakobsen

1995 Winners
Best Scenario: Tidens Ritual by Lars Andresen
Best games persons: 'Tidens Ritual' by Lars Andresen
Best Roles: Concierto de Aranjuez by Per von Fischer
Best Effects: Et  Hjerte af Sten by Anne Winter Ratzer and Soren Maagaard
Best Presentation: Paladins Lampe by Kristoffer Apollo and Christian Savioli
Audience Choice: Midnight Blue by Ask Agger
Honorary Otto: Cool Fish Delivery

1996 Winners
Best Scenario: Dr. Hoffmann's Børn by Morten Juul
Best game people: New York Coppers by Palle Schmidt
Best Roles: Når Et Barn Elsker by Kasper Nørholm
Best Effects: Vogterens Arving by Michael Erik Næsby
Best Illustrations: New York Coppers: Gaden uden nåde by Palle Schmidt
Best Presentation: Inkatemplets Hemmelighed by Flemming Sander Jensen and Per von Fischer
Audience Choice: Oculus Tertius by Jacob Schmidt-Madsen
Honorary Otto: Soren Parbæk

1997 Winners
Best Scenario: Arken by Alex Uth
Best game people: Arken by Alex Uth
Best Roles: Freden by Malik Hyltoft
Best Effects: Følger heldet de tossede by Sune Schmidt-Madsen
Best Illustrations: Nibelungentreue by Ask Agger
Best Presentation: Riget by Claus Ekstrøm
Audience Choice: Arken by Alex Uth
Honorary Otto: Rollespilsmagasinet Fønix

1998 Winners
Best Scenario: Skyggernes Spil by Maiken "Malle" Nielsen and Maria Bergmann
Best games persons: Madame Macbeth by Henrik Vagner
Best Roles: Lydias Bryllup by Jesper Stein Sandal, Daniel BB Clausen and Peter Cornelius Moller
Best Effects: Le Dernier Combat by Thomas Munkholt Sørensen and Lars Andresen
Best Presentation: Le Dernier Combat by Thomas Munkholt Sørensen and Lars Andresen
Audience Choice: Vågenat by Jacob Schmidt-Madsen
Honorary Otto: Kristoffer Apollo and Mette Finderup

1999 Winners
Best Scenario: Deo Gratias by Frederik Berg Olsen
Best game people: Dogme #4 - Monogami by Morten Jaeger (anonymously submitted)
Best Roles: Den sidste sag by Lars Andresen
Best Effects: Dr. Bundwalds Hemmelighed by Daniel BB Clausen et al.
Best Presentation: Helt i Bund by Nicholas Demidoff
Audience Choice: Nevermore by Henrik Vagner
Honorary Otto: Not awarded

2000 Winners
Best Scenario: Messe for en Galning by Michael Eric Naesby and David Riis
Best game people: Majgækken by Sanne Harder
Best Roles: Det sidste korstog by Ask Agger
Best Effects: Athinopa by Jonas Breum Jensen and Anders Vestergaard
Best Presentation: Hjerterfri by Anders Skovgaard-Petersen and Palle Schmidt
Audience Choice: Kongens By by Flemming Lindblad Johansen & Lone Gram Larsen
Jury's Special Prize: Elysium by Mads L. Brynnum
Honorary Otto: Peter Bengtsen

2001 Winners
Best Scenario: Fanden paa Væggen by Palle Schmidt
Best games persons: Dødedans by Lars Andresen
Best Roles: 'Fanden paa Væggen' by Palle Schmidt
Best Effects: Being Max Møller by Max Møller
Best Presentation: 1864 - for Gud, Konge og Fædreland by Klaus Dhiin and Sean Hoeper
Audience Choice: Skyggesiden by Michael EC Sonne
Jury's Special Prize: Brudefærd by Alex Uth
Honorary Otto: Sara Hald

2002 Winners
Best Scenario: Turing Test by Lars Kroll
Best games persons: Elevator by Sebastian Flamant
Best Roles: Bondemænd og Biavlere by Frederik Berg Olsen
Best Effects: Pest eller Kolara by Max Miller
Best Presentation: Hvad natten bringer by Palle Schmidt and Lars Vilhelmsen
Audience Choice: 'Bondemænd og Biavlere' by Frederik Berg Olsen
Honorary Otto: Morten Juul

2003 Winners
Best Scenario: Fortæl mig by Jorgo A. Larsen and Alex Uth
Best game people: Svanevang by Mikkel Bækgaard
Best Roles: Darling er Død by Mette Finderup
Best Effects: Lømler by Max Møller, Frederik Berg Olsen, Lars Vensild and Anders Skovgaard-Petersen
Best Presentation: Mænd af Ære by Kristoffer Apollo
Audience Choice: Drømmen om en konge i gult by Jacob Schmidt-Madsen
Best Live: Meskalin of HC Molbech and Martin W. Jürgensen
Live Audience Award: Fyraften by Eidolon LVE-Sector
Honorary Otto: Natural Born Holmers

2004 Winners
Best Scenario: Samsara by Jacob Schmidt-Madsen
Best game people: Samsara by Jacob Schmidt-Madsen
Best Roles: Luftguitar by Palle Schmidt
Best Effects: Et Lystspil by author group Absurth
Best Presentation: Samsara by Jacob Schmidt-Madsen
Audience Choice: Chiaroscuro by Mikkel Bækgaard
Honorary Otto: Peter Brodersen

2005 Winners
Best Scenario: Det Hemmelige Selskab by Lars Andresen
Best Storytelling: A Day in the Life by Mikkel Bækgaard
Best Tools: SuperHeroes™ by Kristoffer Apollo and Sebastian Flamant
MVP material: Det Halve Kongerige by Tobias Demediuk tether
Best Dissemination: SuperHeroes™ by Kristoffer Apollo and Sebastian Flamant
Jury's Special Prize: Unik by Klaus Meier Olsen
Audience Choice: A Day in the Life by Mikkel Bækgaard
Best Live Scenario: Persona by Maya Krone and Ryan Rohde Hansen
Live Audience Award: Omringet by Mårten Krammer and Christian Møller Christensen
Honorary Otto: Merlin P. Mann

2006 Winners
Best Scenario: Højt under Solen by Jacob Schmidt-Madsen
Best Storytelling: Guernica by Klaus Meier Olsen
Best Tools: Kongemord by Mikkel Bækgaard
MVP material: Ulfheðnar by Alex Uth
Best Dissemination: Den Røde Pest by Lars Andresen
Jury's Special prize: Tupelo by Brian Rasmussen
Audience Choice: Nantonaku Manga of Malik Hyltoft
Honorary Otto Malik Hyltoft

2007 Winners
Best Scenario: Superheroes 3 by Kristoffer Apollo & Sebastian Flamant
Best Storytelling: Doubt by Fredrik Axelzon & Tobias Wrigstad
Best Tools: En Fandes Historie by Jorgo A. Larsen, Anna Lawaetz & Jacob Pondsgård
Best Roles: Sparta by Morten Hougaard & Kristoffer Kjær Jensen
Best Dissemination: Superheroes 3 by Kristoffer Apollo & Sebastian Flamant
Jury's Special Prize: Doubt by Fredrik Axelzon & Tobias Wrigstad
Audience Choice: Memoratoriet: Det rare sted by Morten Greis Petersen & Monica deer Traxl
Honorary Otto: The National Association for Live Roleplay

2008 Winners
Best Scenario: Før Høsten by Klaus Meier Olsen & Jonas Trier-Knudsen
Best Storytelling: Monstre by Simon Steen Hansen
Best Tools: Teknisk Uheld by Fredrik Axelzon Per Wetterstrand & Tobias Wrigstad
Best Roles: Felicias Fortælling by Sanne Harder Flamant
Best Dissemination: Løgstør by Mikkel Bækgaard
Jury's Special Prize: 'Løgstør' by Mikkel Bækgaard
Audience Choice: Felicias Fortælling by Sanne Harder Flamant
Honorary Otto: Brian Rasmussen

2009 Winners
Best Scenario: Reservoir Elves by Kristian Bach Petersen
Best Storytelling: Tortur by Troels Ken Pedersen
Best Tools: Dyst by Kristoffer Rudkjær, Anders Frost Bertelsen and Morten Hougaard
Best Roles: Intet Hjem, Tusind Stjerner by Regitze Illum
Best Dissemination: Kreativ Klasse by Klaus Meier Olsen
Jury's Special: Imperiet compiled by Johannes Busted Larsen and Lars Andresen
Audience Choice: Under My Skin by Emily Care Boss
Honorary Otto: Jesper Wøldiche

2010 Winners
Best Scenario: Vasen by Mikkel Bækgaard
Best Storytelling: Vasen by Mikkel Bækgaard
Best Tools: Hjertebrand by Frikard Ellemand
Best Roles: Salvation by Simon Steen Hansen
Best Dissemination: Slavehandleren fra Ascalon by Johannes Busted Larsen
Jury's Special: Magiens Endeligt by Louise Floor Frellsen
Audience Choice: The Journey by Fredrik Axelzon
Honorary Otto: Vi Åker Jeep

2011 Winners
Best Scenario: BZ'at by Frikard Ellemand
Best Storytelling: Scrapbog by Eva Fog
Best Tools: Femten Mand by Simon Steen Hansen, Niels Jensen and Anders Troelsen
Best Roles: BZ'at by Frikard Ellemand
Best Dissemination: 'Femten Mand' by Simon Steen Hansen, Niels Jensen and Anders Troelsen
Jury's Special Prize: Børnene fra Boldbane 7 by Sally Khallash & Morten Greis Petersen
Audience Choice: Nazisatankirkekrig 2: Unholy Raptor Edition by Benjamin Jorgensen, Milton Felice Brambati Lund & Anders Bo Forest
Honorary Otto: Lars Andresen

2012 Winners
Best Scenario: Spor by Alex K. Uth
Best Storytelling: Lad verden brænde by Peter Fallesen
Best Tools: Verdens ende, by Nina Runa Essendrop
Best Roles: Lille Liverpool, by Mikkel Bækgaard
Best Dissemination: Tilbagefald, by Max Miller
Jury's Special Prize: Dancing with the Clans by The Violator, Lady and Raven fra Fyn
Audience Choice: Dancing with the Clans, The Violator, Lady and Raven fra Fyn
Best Boardgame: Siege Perilous by Martin Bødker Enghoff
Honorary Otto: Klaus Meier Olsen & Kristoffer Rudkjær

2013 Winners
Best Scenario: Plexiglas by Morten Jaeger
Best Storytelling: Det sidste eventyr by Max Miller
Best Tools: Cirkus uden grænser by Danny Meyer Wilson
Best Roles: Suldrup by Mikkel Bækgaard
Best Dissemination: Thorvald Stauning - Varulvejæger by Kristian Bach Petersen
Jury's Special Prize: Depereo by Asbjørn Olsen
Best Games Experience: Sarabande by Maria & Jeppe Bergmann-Hamming
Best Boardgame: Stock Bubbles Jeppe Norsker
Honorary Otto: Jesper Heebøll Arbjørn

2014 Winners
Best Scenario: Outlaw by Anders Frost Bertelsen & Simon Steen Hansen
Best Storytelling: Manden med barnevognen by Alex K. Uth
Best Tools: Fordømt ungdom Lars Andresen & Mette Finderup
Best Roles: Fredløs by Anders Frost Bertelsen & Simon Steen Hansen
Best Presentation: All for One (and Metal for Me) by Klaus Meier Olsen
Jury's Special Prize: Run Them Again by Moyra Turkington & Brand Robins
Best Games Experience: Mass Effect: 2157 by Niels Jensen, Thomas Skuldbøl & Anders Troelsen
Best Boardgame: Honour Among Thieves by Martin Bødkler Enghoff
Honorary Otto: DirtBusters

2015 Winners 
Best Scenario: Forrykt, by Marie Bergmann Hamming and Jeppe Bergmann Hamming
Best Storytelling: Six Months, Three Days by James Stuart and Sara Williamson
Best Tools: Forrykt by Maria og Jeppe Bergmann Hamming
Best Roles: Augustas Skygge by Kristoffer Rudkjær
Best Presentation: Afstand by Morten Jæger
Jury's Special Prize: Hope Was The Last Thing in The Box by Brand Robins
Best Games Experience: Forrykt, by Marie Bergmann Hamming and Jeppe Bergmann Hamming
Best Boardgame: Hivemind by Kasper Lapp
Honorary Otto: Claus Raasted

2016 Winners 
Best Scenario: Indtil Vi Finder Ham by Anders & Rasmus Troelsen
Best Storytelling: Indtil Vi Finder Ham by Rasmus og Anders Troelsen
Best Tools: På Røven I Marienburg by Kristian Bach Petersen
Best Roles: Testamentet by Lars Kaos Andresen
Best Presentation: Testamentet by Lars Kaos Andresen
Jury's Special Prize: Gargantuan by Troels Ken Pedersen
Best Games Experience: På Røven I Marienburg by Kristian Bach Petersen
Best Innovation, Boardgame: Kosmonauter i Krise by Morten Brøsted
Best Boardgame: Mother by Håkan Almer
Honorary Otto: Simon James Pettitt

Guests of Honor

The convention has over time included a couple of international well-known roleplaying designers:

 1994: Mark Rein·Hagen (Vampire: The Masquerade)
 1995: Michael Pondsmith (Castle Falkenstein)
 1996: David Berkman (Theatrix) plus Gunilla Johnsson and Michael Petersén (Kult)
 1997: Keith Herber - furthermore, David Berkman attended as a regular visitor
 2000: Steve Jackson (Steve Jackson Games)
 2005: Greg Costikyan (Paranoia, Toon)
 2009: Emily Care Boss (Black & Green Games)
 2010: Julia Ellingboe (Stone Baby Games)
 2011: Luke Crane and Jared Sorensen
 2012: Lizzie Stark (Leaving Mundania)
 2013: D. Vincent Baker (Dogs in the Vineyard)
 2014: Mark Rein·Hagen (Vampire: The Masquerade)
 2017: Jason Matthews (Twilight Struggle)

External links
 Fastaval homepage (in Danish and English)

Gaming conventions
Annual events in Denmark
1986 establishments in Denmark
Recurring events established in 1986